eleostearic acid is a fatty acid, one of two isomers of octadecatrienoic acid:
 α-Eleostearic acid or (9Z,11E,13E)-9,11,13-octadecatrienoic acid, which occurs in tung oil and bitter gourd seed oil;
 β-Eleostearic acid or (9E,11E,13E)-9,11,13-octadecatrienoic acid.